Loksa is a village in Kuusalu Parish, Harju County in northern Estonia. It lies on the Valgejõgi River, just south of the town of Loksa.

References

Villages in Harju County